Purgatory is the second studio album by American country music singer Tyler Childers. It was released in August 2017 under Hickman Holler.

Reception

The album has received a Metacritic rating of 82 based on 6 reviews, indicating "universal acclaim".

The album has sold 638,178 copies both cd and streamable in the United States as of December 2020.

Accolades

Album art 
The album art appears to be a reference to the shape of Lawrence County, Kentucky, the birthplace of Tyler Childers. Additionally, the coloration and shape are reminiscent of Kentucky agate, a type of agate found in Estill, Jackson, Powell, Madison, and Rockcastle counties in Kentucky that has distinctive red, black, yellow, and gray bands due to its derivation from the Mississippian Borden Formation.

Track listing

Charts

Weekly charts

Year-end charts

Certifications

See also
 Lawrence County, Kentucky

References

2017 albums
Tyler Childers albums